() is the general Korean term for comics and print cartoons. Outside Korea, the term usually refers to South Korean comics.  is greatly influenced by Japanese Manga comics. Modern Manhwa has extended its reach to many other countries. These comics have branched outside of Korea by access of  Webtoons and have created an impact that has resulted in many movie and television show adaptations.

Characteristics
They take on the task of creating a comic that fits a certain format.  is read in the same direction as English books, horizontally and from left to right, because Korean is normally written and read horizontally. It can also be written and read vertically from right to left, top to bottom. Webtoons tend to be structured differently in the way they are meant for scrolling where manga is meant to be looked at page by page. , unlike their manga counterpart, is often in color when posted on the internet, but in black & white when in a printed format.

 art differs from manga and manhua as well with its distinct features. The bodies of characters are often realistically proportioned, while the faces remain unrealistic.  also often have very detailed clothing on their characters as well as intricate backgrounds. Webtoons use vertical scrolling to their advantage to demonstrate movement or the passage of time.  webtoons are also recognized for having simplified dialogue compared to print.

Etymology and influence
Linguistically, manga and  all mean 'comics' in Korean, Japanese and Chinese respectively. According to its Wikipedia article, "manga comes from the Japanese word 漫画, which is composed of two kanji 漫 (man) meaning 'whimsical or impromptu' and 画 (ga) meaning 'pictures.' The same term is the root of the Korean word for comics, 'manhwa,' and the Chinese word 'manhua.'" The Korean , the Japanese manga and the Chinese phrase  are cognates  and their histories and influences intertwine with each other.

Originally the term manhua in Chinese vocabulary was an 18th-century term used in Chinese literati painting. The term  manga was used in Japan to mean "comics" in the late 19th century, when it became popular. Since then, accordingly  manhwa, manga and manhua are all became to mean 'comics' in Korean, Japanese and Chinese.

Although in a traditional sense, the terms manga// had a similar meaning of comical drawing in a broad way, in English the terms  and  generally designate the manga-inspired comic strips. Manga influenced  from the medium’s beginnings during the Japanese occupation of Korea and continued to exert a powerful influence as the manga industry became a major force within Japanese culture and began to export comics abroad.   were not culturally isolated, and the influx of manga into the Korean comics market had a strong effect on the art and content of many artists’ .

History

Korea was under Japanese occupation from 1910 to 1945 and during this time elements of Japanese language and culture were incorporated into Korean society. The term  came into popular use in Korea during the 1920s, when it was applied to cartoons. By the mid 1920s, most newspapers were shut down, and political and social cartoons were abandoned, replaced by humorous illustrations and cartoons geared towards children.

Political cartoon slowly reemerged following the establishment of the Republic of Korea (commonly known as South Korea) in 1948. During the early years of Japanese occupation, newspaper comics featured a great deal of social criticism. Popular artist Kim Yong-hwan started Korea’s first comic magazine, Manhwa Haengjin, in 1948, but it was quickly shut down because the authorities disapproved of the cover.

During the Korean war, Manhwa was used with the aim of boosting the morale of the public.The popularity of comics rose during the 1950s and 1960s, creating diversity of styles and subject matter which led to the construction of new genres such as sunjeong (or soonjung), stories containing romance that are aimed at young women (equivalent to the Japanese genre shoujo). Also around this time another more humorous genre, myeongnyang or happy comics had become popular in order to counteract gritty ones. Manhwabang (lit. comics room), comics cafés and stores that allowed readers to pay a set rate to sit and read comics were also introduced to the public, creating a positive atmosphere around the comics. In response to the increasing publication of comics, as well as social and political changes within South Korea, the government began to enforce censorship laws and, by the mid-1960s, created a comics distribution monopoly that further censored .

In the 1990s, the ban on Japanese media was lifted, which helped to influence the present-day art and styles of contemporary Manhwa. Around this time was when Manhwa had come up in North Korea as well. Then in the early 2000s, the majority of Manhwa was transferred to online sources due to economic collapse that South Korea had experienced at the end of the millennium. because of its transfer to online sources, its popularity overseas has risen. This led to the South Korean search portal to launch LINE Webtoon, a platform for distributing online Manhwa.

Webtoons
The term "Webtoon" (웹툰) is a portmanteau of the Korean words 웹 meaning web and 카툰 meaning cartoon. The term was first coined on 8 August 2000, by Chollian, one of South Korea's oldest and now discontinued internet service engines. Webtoons are the digital form of  that first came into popularity in the early 2000s due to their free access and availability on the internet. It was also beneficial to creators because it helped them get around strict South Korean censorship laws.  Webtoons encourage amateur writers to publish their own stories for others to read. Since their creation, webtoons have gained popularity around the globe and have even been adopted outside of Korea as another form of comic publication. This is credited to their unique format and pay model.

In 2014 WEBTOON's global website and mobile app were launched, revolutionizing the comic world's way of reading for entertainment. Also, around this time JunKoo Kim, the person that started LINE Webtoon, had reported that Webtoon was used in 60 countries, had 55 million monthly users, and 100 billion annual views.

outside of Korea
 has reached all over the world now.  With websites such as TopToon, a webtoon company from Korea that also has a global service in TopToonPlus, people are able to access a wide variety of comics from their phones.  There are also places like WEBTOON that not only allow people to read original comics, but make them as well, opening up this aspect of Korean culture for everyone to take part in. 

But despite that, the relative obscurity of Korean culture in the Western world has caused the word  to remain somewhat unknown in the English-speaking countries. English translations of  have achieved success by targeting the manga and anime community, to the extent that  were marketed as manga by the American publisher Tokyopop.

United States
Sanho Kim was the first  artist working in the States. During the 1960s and 1970s, he worked for publishers Charlton Comics, Warren Publishing, Iron Horse Publishing, Skywald Publications, DC Comics, and Marvel Comics.

According to journalist Paul Gravett, in 1987 Eastern Comics published the first original  in the United States.

Due to the explosion of manga's popularity in the Americas, many of the licensed titles acquired for the American market seek to emulate the popular elements of other successful series. Recently, long-running webtoons serialized via Internet portal sites (e.g. by Daum Media), like Lezhin Comics and personal homepages have become both the creative and popular destination among the younger generation in Korea.
With manga proving to be both popular and commercially successful in Europe and the United States, a number of publishers imported and translated  titles in the hope of reaching the same audience. The readability and left-to-right orientation of  contributed to its growing popularity, as did the realism of the characters and the combination of Eastern and Western styles and mythologies.

Media franchise

Animations based on Korean comics are still relatively rare (though there were several major hits in the late 1980s and early 90s with titles such as Dooly the Little Dinosaur and Fly! Superboard). However, live-action drama series and movie adaptations of  have occurred more frequently in recent years. Full House in 2004 and Goong ("Palace" or "Princess Hours") in 2006 are prominent examples. Below is a list of manhwa titles adapted into television series, web series, and films. Not to be confused to another adapted works of adapted from Webtoons.

Korean  publishers
Note: select publishers only

Daewon C.I.
Haksan Culture Company
Seoul Cultural Publishers
Shinwon Agency Corporation

North American  imprints
ADV Manga
Dark Horse Manhwa
DramaQueen
DrMaster Publications
Media Blasters
Netcomics
NBM ComicsLit
Seven Seas Entertainment
SuperAni
Manta 
UDON's Korean Manhwa
Yen Press

See also
List of manhwa
Myeongnang manhwa
Manhwabang
Culture of South Korea
Korean Wave
Korean animation
Webtoon
Video gaming in South Korea

Citations

Sources 
 
 
 
 
 
 
 
 
 
 
 

 
 

"Korean Comics in the U.S., Part 1, Comic-Con International 2004," Jade Magazine.com, Sep. 2004
"Korean Comics in the U.S., Part 2, Manhwa Sampler," Jade Magazine.com, Sep. 2004
"Sang-Sun Park, Les Bijoux Comic Artist," Sequential Tart.com, Aug. 2004
Manhwa site for "Demon Diary" (마왕일기)
"Infinity Studios and Manhwa," Anime Tourist.com, 16 June 2004
Our Toys, Our Selves: Robot Taekwon V and South Korean Identity
Cain, Geoffrey. "Will the Internet Kill the Manhwa Star?" The Far Eastern Economic Review, 6 November 2009

 
 
Comics formats